In politics, diplomacy and export control, dual-use items refers to goods, software and technology that can be used for both civilian and military applications.

More generally speaking, dual-use can also refer to any goods or technology which can satisfy more than one goal at any given time. Thus, expensive technologies that would otherwise benefit only civilian commercial interests can also be used to serve military purposes if they are not otherwise engaged, such as the Global Positioning System.

The "dual-use dilemma" was first noted with the discovery of the process for synthesizing and mass producing ammonia which revolutionized agriculture with modern fertilizers but also led to the creation of chemical weapons during World War I. The dilemma has long been known in chemistry and physics, and has led to international conventions and treaties, including the Chemical Weapons Convention and the Treaty on the Non-Proliferation of Nuclear Weapons.

Missile 

Originally developed as weapons during the Cold War, the United States and the Soviet Union spent billions of dollars developing rocket technology which could carry humans into space (and even eventually to the moon). The development of this peaceful rocket technology paralleled the development of intercontinental ballistic missile technology; and was a way of demonstrating to the other side the potential of one's own rockets.

Those who seek to develop ballistic missiles may claim that their rockets are for peaceful purposes; for example, for commercial satellite launching or scientific purposes. However, even genuinely peaceful rockets may be converted into weapons and provide the technological basis to do so.

Within peaceful rocket programs, different peaceful applications can be seen as having parallel military roles.  For example, the return of scientific payloads safely to earth from orbit would indicate re-entry vehicle capability and demonstrating the ability to launch multiple satellites with a single launch vehicle can be seen in a military context as having the potential to deploy multiple independently targetable reentry vehicles.

Nuclear 
Dual-use nuclear technology refers to the possibility of military use of civilian nuclear power technology. Many technologies and materials associated with the creation of a nuclear power program have a dual-use capability, in that several stages of the nuclear fuel cycle allow diversion of nuclear materials for nuclear weapons. When this happens a nuclear power program can become a route leading to the atomic bomb or a public annex to a secret bomb program. The crisis over Iran’s nuclear activities is a case in point.

Many UN and US agencies warn that building more nuclear reactors unavoidably increases nuclear proliferation risks. A fundamental goal for American and global security is to minimize the proliferation risks associated with the expansion of nuclear power. If this development is "poorly managed or efforts to contain risks are unsuccessful, the nuclear future will be dangerous". For nuclear power programs to be developed and managed safely and securely, it is important that countries have domestic “good governance” characteristics that will encourage proper nuclear operations and management:
These characteristics include low degrees of corruption (to avoid officials selling materials and technology for their own personal gain as occurred with the A.Q. Khan smuggling network in Pakistan), high degrees of political stability (defined by the World Bank as “likelihood that the government will be destabilized or overthrown by unconstitutional or violent means, including motivated violence and terrorism”), high governmental effectiveness scores (a World Bank aggregate measure of “the quality of the civil service and the degree of its independence from political pressures [and] the quality of policy formulation and implementation”), and a strong degree of regulatory competence.

Artificial intelligence 

As more advances are made towards artificial intelligence (AI), it garners more and more attention on its capability as a dual-use technology and the security risks it may pose. Artificial intelligence can be applied within many different fields and can be easily integrated throughout current technology's cyberspace. With the use of AI, technology has become capable of running multiple algorithms that could solve difficult problems, from detecting anomalies in samples during MRI scans, to providing surveillance of an entire country's residents. Within China's mass surveillance, the government uses AI in order to distinguish citizens with less than satisfactory records among crowds. Every new invention or application made with AI comes with its own set of positive and negative effects. Some claim that, as potential uses for AI grow in number, nations need to start regulating it as a dual-use technology.

Chemical 

The modern history of chemical weapons can be traced back to the chemical industries of the belligerent nations of World War I, especially that of Germany. Many industrial chemical processes produce toxic intermediary stages, final products, and by-products, and any nation with a chemical industry has the potential to create weaponised chemical agents. Chlorine is a chemical agent found within several household items such as Bleach and provides various benefits with its wide array of applications. However, it can also be used as in chemical weapon.

Biological 

That the July 2007 terrorist attacks in central London and at Glasgow airport may have involved National Health Service medical professionals was a recent wake-up call that screening people with access to pathogens may be necessary. The challenge remains to maintain security without impairing the contributions to progress afforded by research.

Reports from the project on building a sustainable culture in dual-use bioethics suggest that, as a result of perceived changes in both science and security over the past decade, several states and multilateral bodies have underlined the importance of making life scientists aware of concerns over dual-use and the legal obligations underpinning the prevention of biological weapons. One of the key mechanisms that have been identified to achieve this is through the education of life science students, with the objective of building what has been termed a “culture of responsibility”.

At the 2008 Meeting of States Parties to the Biological and Toxin Weapons Convention (BTWC), it was agreed by consensus that: States Parties recognized the importance of ensuring that those working in the biological sciences are aware of their obligations under the Convention and relevant national legislation and guidelines...States Parties noted that formal requirements for seminars, modules or courses, including possible mandatory components, in relevant scientific and engineering training programmes and continuing professional education could assist in raising awareness and in implementing the Convention.

The World Health Organization in 2010 developed a "guidance document" for what it called "Dual Use Research of Concern" (DURC) in the life sciences, regarding “research that is intended [to] benefit, but which might easily be misapplied to do harm".

Along with several similar stipulations from other states and regional organisations,  biosecurity education has become more important. Unfortunately, both the policy and academic literature show that life scientists across the globe are frequently uninformed or underinformed about biosecurity, dual-use, the BTWC and national legislation outlawing biological weapons. Moreover, despite numerous declarations by states and multilateral organisations, the extent to which statements at the international level have trickled down to multifaceted activity at the level of scientists remains limited.

The US federal government (USG) developed at least two policy document in light of the WHO guidance document on DURC. In March 2012, The "United States Government Policy for Oversight of Life Sciences Dual use Research of Concern" was published, in order to establish regular review by oversight bodies into USG-funded DURC. In September 2014, the "United States Government Policy for Institutional Oversight of Life Sciences Dual Use Research of Concern" was published, in order to identify DURC and mitigate it "at the institutional level" such as universities.

Night vision and thermal imaging 
Night-vision devices with extraordinary performance characteristics (high gain, specific spectral sensitivity, fine resolution, low noise) are heavily export-restricted by the few states capable of producing them, mainly to limit their proliferation to enemy combatants, but also to slow the inevitable reverse-engineering undertaken by other world powers.

These precision components, such as the image intensifiers used in night vision goggles and the focal plane arrays found in surveillance satellites and thermal cameras, have numerous civil applications which include nature photography, medical imaging, firefighting, and population control of predator species.

Night scenes of wild elephants and rhinos in the BBC nature documentary series Africa were shot on a Lunax Starlight HD camera (a custom-built digital cinema rig encompassing a Generation 3 image intensifier), and recolored digitally.

In the United States, civilians are free to buy and sell American-made night vision and thermal systems, such as those manufactured by defense contractors Harris, L3 Insight, and FLIR Systems, with very few restrictions. However, American night vision owners may not bring the equipment out of the country, sell it internationally, or even invite non-citizens to examine the technology, per International Traffic in Arms Regulations.

Export of American image intensifiers is selectively permitted under license by the United States Department of Commerce and the State Department. Contributing factors in acquiring a license include diplomatic relations with the destination country, number of pieces to be sold, and the relative quality of the equipment itself, expressed using a Figure Of Merit (FOM) score calculated from several key performance characteristics.

Competing international manufacturers (European defense contractor Photonis Group, Japanese scientific instrument giant Hamamatsu Photonics, and Russian state-financed laboratory JSC Katod) have entered the American market through licensed importers. In spite of their foreign origin, re-export of these components outside of the United States is restricted similarly to domestic components.

A 2012 assessment of the sector by the Department of Commerce and Bureau of Industry and Security made the case for relaxing export controls in light of the narrowing performance gap and increased competition internationally, and a review period undertaken by the Directorate of Defense Trade Controls in 2015 introduced much more granular performance definitions.

Other technologies 

In addition to obvious and headline-grabbing dual-use technologies there are some less obvious ones, in that many erstwhile peaceful technologies can be used in weapons. One example during the First and Second World War is the role of German toy manufacturers: Germany was one of the leading nations in the production of wind-up toys, and the ability to produce large numbers of small and reliable clockwork motors was converted into the ability to produce shell and bomb fuzes. During its early stages of release, the PlayStation 2 was considered to be a dual-use technology. The gaming console had to receive special import regulations before being shipped towards the U.S and European markets. This is due to the console's and its included GPU's capability to process high quality images at high speeds, a shared trait with missile guidance systems.

HoloLens 2 
Early 2019, Microsoft announced the HoloLens 2, smart glasses that will allow consumers to experience augmented reality within the real world. However, it was revealed Microsoft made a 479 million dollar deal with the U.S government. This contract would have Microsoft create and supply the U.S Army a separate version of the HoloLens smart glasses called the Integrated Visual Augmented System (IVAS). The IVAS would be used to train soldiers, as well as field medics with battlefield experience within a virtual environment. This version of the HoloLens allowed the soldiers to have a virtual map of their current environment, friendly units' locations, and much more. An anonymous Microsoft employee published an open letter demanding that Microsoft terminate the IVAS contract. Microsoft president Brad Smith had previously made a public blog post outlining the company's stance on "how technology companies should work with the government, and specifically whether companies should supply digital technology to the military."

Control 

Most industrial countries have export controls on certain types of designated dual-use technologies, and they are required by a number of treaties as well. These controls restrict the export of certain commodities and technologies without the permission of the government.

In the context of sanctions regimes, dual-use can be construed broadly because there are few things which do not have the potential for both military and civilian uses.

United States 
The principal agency for investigating violations of dual-use export controls in the United States is the Bureau of Industry and Security (BIS) Office of Export Enforcement (OEE).  Interagency coordination of export control cases are conducted through the Export Enforcement Coordination Center (E2C2). The International Traffic in Arms Regulations is the US regime that the BIS OEE enforces.

Canada 
The Canadian legislation to govern the trade in dual-use technology is known as the Export and Imports Permits Act.

European Union 
The European Union governs dual-use technology through the Control List of Dual Use Items.

International regimes 
There are several international arrangements among countries which seek to harmonize lists of dual-use (and military) technologies to control. These include the Nuclear Suppliers Group, the Australia Group, which looks at chemical and biological technologies, the Missile Technology Control Regime, which covers delivery systems for weapons of mass destruction, and the Wassenaar Arrangement, which covers conventional arms and dual-use technologies.

See also 
Treaty on the Non-Proliferation of Nuclear Weapons

References

External links 

U.S. Department of Commerce, Bureau of Industry and Security
Militarily Critical Technologies List (MCTL) from the US Government's Defense Technical Information Center
Federation of American Scientists Case Studies in Dual-Use Research
 University of Bradford Disarmament Research Centre Dual Use Bioethics Homepage.
European Commission, List of Dual-use items and technologies
Commission updates EU control list on dual use items (22 October 2014)
European Parliament Rapporteur Marietje Schaake on Dual-Use / Surveillance Technology

Military technology
Nuclear proliferation